Hedong is a town of Wuhua County in eastern Guangdong province, China, located southeast of and adjacent to the county seat. , it has three residential communities and 43 villages under its administration.

See also
List of township-level divisions of Guangdong

References

Towns in Guangdong
Wuhua County